Death of a Champion is a 1939 American film starring Lynne Overman, Virginia Dale, Joseph Allen, and Donald O'Connor.

Its plot concerns an effort by detectives to discover who killed a famous show dog. The film also stars Robert Paige, who went on to be in three more films with O'Connor.

Cast 
 Lynne Overman as Oliver Quade
 Virginia Dale as Patsy Doyle
 Joseph Allen as Richie Oakes
 Donald O'Connor as Small Fry
 Susan Paley as Lois Lanyard
 Harry Davenport  as Guy Lanyard
 Robert Paige as Alec Temple
David Clyde as Angus McTavish

External links 
 

1939 films
1930s English-language films
Films directed by Robert Florey
Paramount Pictures films
1939 mystery films
1939 crime films
American mystery films
American black-and-white films
American crime films
1930s American films